The Durham University Botanic Garden is a botanical garden located in Durham, England. The botanic gardens have been located on their present site since 1970 before being officially opened in 1988 by the then Chancellor Dame Margot Fonteyn and now attract some 80,000 visitors annually.

Botanic Garden features

The garden has an array of exotic plants with collections ranging from Chile in South America, China and Japan in the Far East, as well as from Southern Africa and New Zealand.

The garden is also home to an arboretum, Alpine garden and bamboo grove. Within the glasshouses tropical rainforest flora, desert plants and species from the Mediterranean are on show as well as tropical insects such as stick insects, scorpions, butterflies and tarantulas.

A science trail operates within the garden which was developed by a biologist at the university, Dr. Phil Gates, with funding from the Biotechnology and Biological Sciences Research Council. Art-work is also displayed in the garden with various sculptures located around the site.

The gardens host a variety of events ranging from seminars and guided tours to a local watch group for children and flower shows.

References

External links

Botanic Garden Homepage
Durham Tourism Office Information on the gardens
Images of the Cactus House

1970 establishments in England
Botanic Garden
Botanical gardens in England
Gardens in County Durham